Shawshank State Prison is a fictional New England state prison in the state of Maine. It serves as the primary location in the novella Rita Hayworth and Shawshank Redemption by Stephen King, as well as its subsequent film adaptation. The prison has also been mentioned in several other works by King.

Overview
Shawshank State Prison first appeared in Stephen King's novella entitled Rita Hayworth and Shawshank Redemption. The story was originally published in the 1982 short story collection Different Seasons alongside three other novellas, two of which also referenced the prison.

The Shawshank Redemption, a motion picture based on the novella, was released in 1994. The actual building used for filming was the Ohio State Reformatory in Mansfield, Ohio.

Shawshank State Prison also appears in several episodes of the Hulu original series Castle Rock. For the series, the showrunners used the West Virginia Penitentiary as the prison. “Part of the reason we chose the prison that we chose to shoot at was we loved the idea that there are houses literally in the shadow of the prison," said showrunner Sam Shaw. "It’s pretty different from the amazing prison in Ohio that they shot for the movie, which stands alone."

Works that reference Shawshank State Prison

In other media
Apart from appearing in the Castle Rock TV series, Shawshank State Prison is also mentioned in two episodes of Haven, and an episode of Murder, She Wrote. References to the prison can also be found in works of King's son Joe Hill, including the novel NOS4A2 and the 2019 comic Basket Full of Heads.

The name "Shawshank" is often used in popular culture as a noun to reference a successful prison break. An example of this can be found in the twelfth episode of The Flash'''s first season. The series features cast members from The Shawshank Redemption'', including Clancy Brown and William Sadler.

See also
 Shawshank tree, a white oak tree featured in the 1994 film.

References

Fictional prisons
Fictional populated places created by Stephen King
Castle Rock (franchise)
Fictional elements introduced in 1982